Macrocheles submarginatus is a species of mite in the family Macrochelidae.

References

submarginatus
Articles created by Qbugbot
Animals described in 1900